The men's 50m Breaststroke event at the 2006 Central American and Caribbean Games occurred on Friday, July 22, 2006 at the S.U. Pedro de Heredia Aquatic Complex in Cartagena, Colombia.

Records

Results

Final

Preliminaries

References

Breaststroke, Men's 50m